Long Road in the Dunes is a 1981 Soviet Latvian seven-part TV melodrama, directed by Aloizs Brenčs. The original series was shot in Latvian by the Riga Film Studio, and an additional version was released with Russian voiceovers.

Plot
The action takes place in Latvia and covers the period from 1939 to the present day. The events that took place in the country had different influences on the fate of the heroes. But all of them were led through life by love scattered and collected, forced to suffer cruelly and made the happiest in the world. The love story of Artūrs Banga, the son of a fisherman, and Marta Ozola, who carried their feelings through all the difficulties and sorrows of the military and post-WWII years.

Cast
Lilita Ozoliņa as Marta Ozola (Russian voiceover by Valentina Talyzina)
Juozas Kiselius as Artūrs Banga (Latvian voiceover by Rolands Zagorskis, Russian voiceover by Aleksei Pankin)
Romualdas Ramanauskas as Rihards Lozbergs (Latvian voiceover by Ģirts Jakovļevs, Russian voiceover by Valery Ryzhakov)
Eduards Pāvuls as Jēkabs Ozols, Marta's father (Russian voiceover by Vladimir Safronov)
Ārijs Geikins as Innkeeper Āboltiņš
Aare Laanemets as Laimonis Kalniņš
Dzidra Ritenberga as Erna
Harijs Liepiņš as Lawyer Osvalds Kreizis
Evgeny Zharikov as Otto Grīnbergs / Alexander Efimov
Merle Talvik as Ilga
Ivan Ryzhov as Mityay Akimych
Lyubov Sokolova as Anisya, Mityay's wife (Latvian voiceover by Velta Krūze)
Pauls Butkēvičs as Heinrihs Strautnieks (Russian voiceover by Boris Bystrov)
Velta Līne as Maiga
Arnis Līcītis as Dr. Lorans (uncredited)

Filming
 Initially, the role of Marta was to be given to actress Vija Artmane.
 Episodes 6 and 7 were filmed in the village of Yalguba, Karelian ASSR as a substitute for the deportee village in Siberia.

References

External links 
 

Films directed by Aloizs Brenčs
Latvian-language films
1980s Russian-language films
1980 television films
1980 films
1981 television films
1981 films
Soviet television films
Latvian television films
Latvian television series
1980s Soviet television series
Riga Film Studio films